Moriondo may refer to:

 Moriondo Torinese, comune in the Metropolitan City of Turin in the Italian region Piedmont
 Angelo Moriondo, inventor usually credited for patenting the earliest known espresso machine
 Chloe Moriondo, American singer-songwriter and YouTuber born